Samuel Jon Clint Corley (born 1976) is a British Anglican bishop. Since 2021, he has been the Bishop of Stockport, one of two suffragan bishops in the Church of England Diocese of Chester. He previously served as Rector of Leeds Minster (in the Diocese of Leeds) from 2015 to 2021.

Biography
Corley studied theology at St Aidan's College, Durham (BA, MA), and trained as a history teacher at Hughes Hall, Cambridge (PGCE). He then taught history in a school in Sutton, Greater London.

Corley trained for ministry at St John's College, Nottingham (MA), and was ordained in the Church of England as a deacon in 2004 and as a priest in 2005. He served his curacy at St Thomas' Church, Lancaster in the Diocese of Blackburn between 2004 and 2008. From 2008 to 2011, he was an assistant diocesan missioner and priest in charge of St John's Church, Ellel. In 2011, he moved to the Diocese of Bradford as a canon precentor of Bradford Cathedral and senior chaplain to the University of Bradford. On 6 October 2015, he was licensed as rector-designate of Leeds Minster in the recently formed Diocese of Leeds.

On 27 May 2021, it was announced that he would be the next Bishop of Stockport in the Diocese of Chester. He legally took up the post on 19 July 2021, the day of his consecration as a bishop by Stephen Cottrell, Archbishop of York, at York Minster; he was consecrated alongside the other new suffragan of the diocese, Julie Conalty, Bishop of Birkenhead.

References

1976 births
21st-century Anglican priests
21st-century Anglican bishops
Bishops of Stockport
Living people
Alumni of St Aidan's College, Durham
Alumni of Hughes Hall, Cambridge